Freedom is a borough in Beaver County, Pennsylvania, United States, located along the Ohio River  northwest of Pittsburgh. The population was 1,495 at the 2020 census. It is a northern suburb of the Pittsburgh metropolitan area. Originally founded as a steamboat building town, chief industries later included the production of oil, caskets, and monuments.

History
In 1824, the Harmony Society returned to Pennsylvania from Indiana.  The society settled in what is now Ambridge, five miles (8 km) up the Ohio River.  One of the reasons the society left Indiana was because of harassment for their abolitionist activities. Their settlement was in Beaver County, along the Ohio River. There they founded "Ökonomie," now better known as Old Economy Village.  Here, the Society gained worldwide recognition for its religious devotion and economic prosperity. 

The Harmonites were abolitionists, and began placing signs along the Ohio River with one word, "FREEDOM".  The area of the present-day borough of Freedom began to be called such on maps of the Ohio River used by the steamboat navigators.

Establishment

The community of Freedom was founded in 1832 by Jonathan Betz and Stephen Phillips, co-owners of a steamboat building business. The original village was surveyed and plotted by Simon Meredith. All of the lots, streets and alleys were located with special preference to the steamboat-building business, the only business at the time. Later, an additional  were purchased from Captain William Vicary for $2,500.00. Vicary himself retained some property in the area, including a stone house; today, the house remains a local landmark, and is listed on the National Register of Historic Places.

About 150 people first located in Freedom and it grew rapidly. The town was laid out on a Tuesday and by the following Saturday, fourteen houses had been built. In 1833, Freedom contained 40 dwellings, 47 families, and about 320 people. Boat building and distilling were its two main businesses.

By 1837, Freedom had grown to a population of about 600, and 100 dwellings. New businesses included a foundry, and steam engines manufactured by J. Baker and Company, a large steam sawmill, and an extensive distillery and gristmill owned by J. Stahl and Company. The merchants at that time were: Phillips and McConnell, Stile and Fisher, Phillip Bentel, John Donnan, J. W. Mead, three innkeepers: Samuel Furnier, J. W. Snead, and Thomas G. Kerr and two physicians: Drs. William Smith and T. F. Robinson.

In 1896, the neighboring borough of Saint Clair was absorbed by Freedom. Saint Clair Borough was located in what is currently Freedom's second ward. It was laid out by Captain William Vicary and was often simply called Vicary or Vicary Extension.

Geography
Freedom is located at  (40.684316, -80.251667). Freedom has three borders, including the borough of East Rochester to the northwest, New Sewickley Township to the east and northeast and the borough of Conway to the south.  Freedom also runs adjacent with the borough of Monaca across the Ohio River.

Demographics

As of the census of 2000, there were 1,763 people, 687 households, and 469 families residing in the borough. The population density was 2,984.4 people per square mile (1,153.7/km²). There were 731 housing units at an average density of 1,237.4 per square mile (478.4/km²). The racial makeup of the borough was 92.80% White, 5.16% African American, 0.06% Native American, 0.23% Asian, 0.23% from other races, and 1.53% from two or more races. Hispanic or Latino of any race were 0.74% of the population.

There were 687 households, out of which 32.6% had children under the age of 18 living with them, 44.0% were married couples living together, 18.5% had a female householder with no husband present, and 31.6% were non-families. 26.9% of all households were made up of individuals, and 10.3% had someone living alone who was 65 years of age or older. The average household size was 2.56 and the average family size was 3.09.

In the borough the population was spread out, with 25.8% under the age of 18, 10.4% from 18 to 24, 29.0% from 25 to 44, 20.8% from 45 to 64, and 14.0% who were 65 years of age or older. The median age was 36 years. For every 100 females, there were 93.7 males. For every 100 females age 18 and over, there were 85.9 males.

The median income for a household in the borough was $30,741, and the median income for a family was $38,000. Males had a median income of $30,303 versus $23,438 for females. The per capita income for the borough was $16,261. About 12.2% of families and 14.5% of the population were below the poverty line, including 21.8% of those under age 18 and 8.6% of those age 65 or over.

Education
Children in Freedom are served by the Freedom Area School District. The current schools serving Freedom are:
Freedom Area Elementary School – grades K-4
Freedom Area Middle School – grades 5-8
Freedom Area Senior High School – grades 9-12

Notable people
 Dominic DeNucci – professional wrestler
 Josh Sharpless – former Major League Baseball relief pitcher
 John Warhola – artist, brother of Andy Warhol who established The Andy Warhol Museum and the Andy Warhol Museum of Modern Art

See also
 List of cities and towns along the Ohio River

References

External links
 Borough of Freedom official Website

Pennsylvania populated places on the Ohio River
Populated places established in 1832
Boroughs in Beaver County, Pennsylvania
1832 establishments in Pennsylvania